Ángel Luis Rodríguez Díaz (born 26 April 1987), known simply as Ángel, is a Spanish professional footballer who plays as a forward for RCD Mallorca.

Club career

Tenerife
Born in Santa Cruz de Tenerife, Ángel emerged through the youth ranks of local CD Tenerife, scoring seven Segunda División goals in his first full professional season. He split 2007–08 on loan to Segunda División B teams Real Madrid Castilla and CA Osasuna B.

Ángel returned to the Canary Islands for 2008–09, being an important attacking element as the club returned to La Liga after a seven-year absence. He made his debut in the competition on 29 August 2009, in a 1–0 away loss against Real Zaragoza (ten minutes played). He contributed one goal in 24 games – all as a substitute – during the campaign, in an eventual relegation.

Elche, Levante and Eibar
In the summer of 2010, Ángel returned to the second division as he signed with Elche CF. On 23 April 2011, he scored all of his side's goals in a 3–0 home win over SD Huesca, totalling 29 during his spell at the Estadio Manuel Martínez Valero, including once in the unsuccessful promotion playoffs against Real Valladolid.

Ángel joined top-flight team Levante UD on 15 June 2012, agreeing to a 2+1 deal. He scored twice in the group stage of the UEFA Europa League in the first half of the season but, after seeing playing opportunities limited, returned to former side Elche in January 2013 on loan.

Levante did not renew his contract after the end of the 2013–14 campaign and on 9 July, Ángel moved to newly promoted SD Eibar on a one-year deal, with an option to extend for a further year.

Zaragoza
On 13 July 2015, Ángel signed a two-year deal for Zaragoza of the second tier. In 2016–17, he scored a career-best 21 goals. 

On 7 June 2017, the club announced that they had ceased all negotiations regarding a possible contract renewal after Ángel said that he would rather lose against his former team Tenerife in the last match of the season.

Getafe
Ángel joined Getafe CF on 6 July 2017, until 2020. He scored 13 times in his first year, helping them finish eighth in the top tier.

Mallorca
On 2 July 2021, free agent Ángel signed a two-year contract with RCD Mallorca, newly promoted to the top division.

Career statistics

Club

Honours
Elche
Segunda División: 2012–13

Individual
Copa del Rey top scorer: 2018–19 (5 goals)

References

External links

1987 births
Living people
Spanish footballers
Footballers from Santa Cruz de Tenerife
Association football forwards
La Liga players
Segunda División players
Segunda División B players
Tercera División players
CD Tenerife B players
CD Tenerife players
Real Madrid Castilla footballers
CA Osasuna B players
Elche CF players
Levante UD footballers
SD Eibar footballers
Real Zaragoza players
Getafe CF footballers
RCD Mallorca players
Spain youth international footballers